John James is an American actor and producer best known to television audiences for playing the character of Jeff Colby in both the prime-time soap opera Dynasty and its spin-off series The Colbys throughout the 1980s.

Career
James is a veteran of daytime soaps, first appearing in Search for Tomorrow in the late 1970s. In 1981, he won the role of Jeff Colby in Dynasty, appearing in the very first episode, "Oil", and remaining on the soap opera until the final episode, Catch 22 in 1989. James played the same role in The Colbys between 1985 and 1987, and one last time in the 1991 TV movie, Dynasty: The Reunion.

James was nominated for a Golden Globe Award for his role in Dynasty in 1985 and appeared at the 1986 ceremony. The Golden Globe Award for Best Supporting Actor – Series, Miniseries or Television Film went to Edward James Olmos.

James returned to the genre playing Rick Decker on As the World Turns in 2003–2004. In May 2006, he was cast in the role of Dr. Jeff Martin (the first husband of Erica Kane played by series star Susan Lucci) on the ABC daytime soap opera All My Children. He began appearing the following month. On July 15, 2008, James returned to As the World Turns, reprising the role of demented Dr. Rick Decker.

In film, James starred in Icebreaker (2000) with Sean Astin, Bruce Campbell, and Stacy Keach; in The Cursed aka Peril (2001) with Morgan Fairchild and Michael Pare; in Lightning: Fire from the Sky (2001) with Jesse Eisenberg, Stacy Keach and John Schneider and in Chronology (2015) with William Baldwin and Danny Trejo, all of which were directed by David Giancola.

He produced and starred in Illegal Aliens (2007). In 2012, James starred in the Giancola documentary, Addicted to Fame (2012), about the making of their film Illegal Aliens. In 2016, James produced and starred in another Giancola film — the sci-fi action adventure, Axcellerator which reunited him with The Colbys co-star Maxwell Caulfield while James' daughter Laura played one of the roles.

James has appeared on stage intermittently, from musicals for the producer John Kenley to a 1996 national tour of Dial 'M' for Murder with Roddy McDowall, to playing Captain Keller in Judson Theatre Company's The Miracle Worker in 2018.

Personal life
James was born in Minneapolis, Minnesota, as one of the three children of radio broadcaster Herb Oscar Anderson (1928—2017) and his first wife. His brother, Herb Oscar Anderson II, is an actor.

In 1989, James married Denise Ellen Coward (born 1955 in Australia), a model and 2nd Runner-up for Miss World 1978. They have two children. In 2012, James' daughter, Laura, won America's Next Top Model, Cycle 19. His son Phillip is serving in the United States Air Force.

In 2014, James considered running as a Republican for New York's 21st congressional district.

Filmography

Self

 The Home and Family Show - Dynasty Reunion (2015)
 America's Next Top Model - Laura's Father (2012)
 The Life and Death of Anna Nicole Smith (2007)
 Intimate Portrait (TV series) - Emma Samms (2002)
 After They Were Famous - Dynasty (2002)
 E! True Hollywood Story - Dynasty (2001)
 Denver-Clan ohne Maske (1994)
 The Joan Rivers Show - November, 4 (1991)
 Live! with Kelly and Michael - October 18, (1991)
 Entertainment Tonight November, 11 (1987)
 Macy's Thanksgiving Day Parade TV Special (1986)
 The 12th Annual People's Choice Awards (1986)
 The 43rd Annual Golden Globe Awards (1986)
 The 11th Annual People's Choice Awards (1985)
 Christmas with the Carringtons BBC TV Special (1985)
 Breakaway TV Series (1984)
 Battle of the Network Stars XVI - ABC Team Captain (1984)
 The 10th Annual People's Choice Awards (1984)
 Battle of the Network Stars XIV - ABC Team Captain (1983)
 The Merv Griffin Show - February 12 (1983)
 The Merv Griffin Show - November 6 (1982)
 Miss USA 1982 - Celebrity Judge (1982)
 Battle of the Network Stars XIII - ABC Team (1982)
 Battle of the Network Stars XII - ABC Team (1982)

Awards

Discography
This Time b/w Fooling Around (with Heidi Bruhl; 1984)
Painted Dreams b/w Sleeping In Your Arms Again (1985) (GER # 60, 5 weeks)

References

External links
 
 

American male soap opera actors
New York (state) Republicans
Living people
Year of birth missing (living people)